The Treaty of Valparaiso was an agreement between Chile and Bolivia that ended the War of the Pacific. Signed on April 4, 1884, the third treaty of the war forced Bolivia to give Antofagasta to Chile.

References

See also

Treaties concluded in 1884
1884 in Chile
1884 in Bolivia
Bolivia–Chile treaties
Peace treaties
Treaties involving territorial changes
War of the Pacific
Treaties entered into force in 1884